The Inorganic Chemistry Division of the International Union of Pure and Applied Chemistry (IUPAC), also known as Division II, deals with all aspects of inorganic chemistry, including materials and  bioinorganic chemistry, and also with isotopes, atomic weights and the  periodic table. It furthermore advises the Chemical Nomenclature and Structure Representation Division (Division VIII) on issues dealing with inorganic compounds and materials.
For the general public, the  most visible result of the division's work is that it evaluates and advises the IUPAC on names and symbols proposed for new elements that have been approved for addition to the periodic table.  For the scientific end educational community the work on isotopic abundances and atomic weights is of fundamental importance as these numbers are continuously checked and updated.

Subcommittees 

The division has the following subcommittees and commissions:
 Subcommittee on Isotopic Abundance Measurements
 Interdivisional Subcommittee on Materials Chemistry
 Subcommittee on Stable Isotope Reference Material Assessment
 Commission on Isotopic Abundances and Atomic Weights (CIAAW)

Running Projects 

List of  Running Projects of IUPAC Division II
 Recommendations for Isotope Data in Geosciences
 Priority claims for the discovery of elements with atomic number greater than 111
 Evaluation of Isotopic Abundance Variations in Selected Heavier Elements
 Evaluated Compilation of International Reference Materials for Isotope Abundance Measurements
 Development of an Isotopic Periodic Table for the Educational Community 
 Towards a comprehensive definition of oxidation state
 Coordination polymers and metal organic frameworks: nomenclature guidelines 
 Evaluation of Radiogenic Abundance Variations in Selected Elements
 Technical Guidelines for Isotope Abundances and Atomic Weight Measurements
 Assessment of Stable Isotopic Reference and Inter-Comparison Materials
 Online evaluated isotope ratio database for use communities (2011-2014)
 Evaluated Published Isotope Ratio Data (2010- 2011)
 Guidelines for Measurement of Luminescence Spectra and Quantum Yields of Inorganic Compounds, Metal Complexes and Materials
 Terminology and definition of quantities related to the isotope distribution in elements with more than two stable isotopes
 Evaluated published isotope ratio data (2011- 2013)
 Evaluation of published lead isotopic data (1950- 2013) for a new standard atomic weight of lead
 Development a procedure for using intervals instead of fixed values for atomic weights: an educational exercise

Former projects and other notable activities 

The Inorganic Chemistry Division was a partner in the 2011 Global Chemistry Experiment “Water: A Chemical Solution” that took part during the International Year of Chemistry.

Notable former division members 
 Mary L. Good former president
 Norman Greenwood former president
 Edward Wichers president 1955–1957

See also

 Chemical nomenclature
 Commission on Isotopic Abundances and Atomic Weights

References 

Chemical nomenclature
Chemistry organizations
International scientific organizations
Standards organisations in Switzerland